"Play It for the Girls" is an English language song by Danny Saucedo, better known as Danny, from his album Heart Beats. The song was written by Jonas von der Burg and Anoo Bhagavan.

It entered the Swedish Singles Chart on 31 May 2007 and reached number one on the chart on 7 June 2007, one week after its release. It stayed 17 weeks in total on the chart.

Chart performance

Charts

References 

Danny Saucedo songs
2007 singles
Number-one singles in Sweden
Songs written by Jonas von der Burg
Songs written by Anoo Bhagavan
Sony Music singles
2007 songs